"Face Off" is the thirteenth episode and season finale of the fourth season of the American television drama Breaking Bad, and the 46th overall episode of the series. It originally aired on AMC in the United States on October 9, 2011. It was directed and written by series creator and executive producer Vince Gilligan.

The episode marks the culmination of the arc concerning the conflict between Walter White (Bryan Cranston) and Gus Fring (Giancarlo Esposito) which served as the focus of the fourth season. The episode marks Esposito's final appearance in the series as Fring, as well as the final appearances of recurring characters Hector Salamanca and Tyrus Kitt, played by Mark Margolis and Ray Campbell, respectively. All three would reprise their roles in the Breaking Bad prequel series Better Call Saul.

The episode received widespread critical acclaim on its initial airing and was named by TV Guide as one of the best television episodes of 2011.

Plot 
Walter White removes the bomb from Gus Fring's car and asks Jesse Pinkman if he knows of a place Gus frequents that does not have security cameras. Before Jesse can think of one, he is approached and interrogated by two detectives concerned about his knowledge of ricin. When Saul Goodman arrives as Jesse's lawyer, Jesse tells him of a potential location that Gus goes to that is not well guarded: Hector Salamanca's retirement home, the Casa Tranquila.

Walt visits Hector and offers him a truce via an opportunity to kill Gus as revenge. Hector asks to speak with the DEA but rather than disclosing anything, simply insults them (by spelling out S-U-C-K-M-Y and F-U-C on a letter board). However, Gus believes Hector is going to the DEA to tell them about his true identity and visits Hector to kill him, as Walt anticipated. Tyrus Kitt inspects Hector's retirement home room for any traps but finds nothing. Gus enters and admonishes Hector for supposedly being a coward, and prepares to kill him via lethal injection. However, Hector looks up at Gus for the first time in years, with a helpless expression, and Gus is shocked. Hector then breaks out into a rage, smiling and repeatedly ringing his bell, detonating the bomb underneath his wheelchair. The explosion kills him and Tyrus. Gus walks out of the room with his face half blown off, before dying.

Walt hears the news of the explosion on the radio and is relieved. Jesse is released from police custody but is forced to cook meth at the lab at gunpoint. Walt heads to the lab, kills Gus' two henchmen stationed there, and frees Jesse. Knowing that Hank Schrader is closing in on the lab, Walt and Jesse burn it down.

Later, Jesse tells Walt that Brock Cantillo will live and that he was poisoned by lily of the valley berries, which children sometimes eat because of their sweet taste. Although Jesse questions killing Gus, since Gus never poisoned Brock after all, Walt assures Jesse that it had to be done. Walt calls Skyler White, who is—along with the rest of the family, still under lockdown-learning of the explosion from the news. Skyler asks Walt if he had caused the explosion and what happened, to which he simply replies, "I won". The episode ends with a shot of a lily of the valley plant in Walt's backyard, revealing that it was indeed Walt who poisoned Brock.

Production 

The episode was written and directed by the series creator Vince Gilligan. It marked Gilligan's final directorial credit on the series before the series finale.

This episode marks the final appearance in the series of Giancarlo Esposito as Gus Fring, and recurring actors Mark Margolis as Hector Salamanca and Ray Campbell as Tyrus Kitt. Esposito, Campbell and Margolis would reprise their respective roles in Breaking Bad spin-off series Better Call Saul: Margolis from the show's second season, and Esposito and Campbell from the third.

The plot wrapup was planned by the series' production team since the beginning of the season, partly because they were not certain at the time whether the series was going to be renewed for another season. The visual effect of Gus Fring's massive facial wounds took months to prepare, with assistance from Greg Nicotero and the special effects team from fellow AMC drama The Walking Dead. The effect was produced using elaborate makeup on Giancarlo Esposito's face, with additional computer-generated imagery that combined two separate shots. The episode's title "Face Off" was also meant to be a reference to Gus losing half of his face in the explosion.

The songs playing throughout the episode were "Black" by Danger Mouse and Daniele Luppi featuring Norah Jones, "Goodbye" by Apparat, and "Freestyle" by Taalbi Brothers. The use of all three songs was praised as among the series' greatest musical choices by Uproxx, while Complex specifically named "Black" on a similar list.

Reception

Critical reception 

The episode received unanimous acclaim from television critics. Seth Amitin of IGN awarded the episode 9.5 out of 10, describing it as "the perfect blend of Breaking Bad". Alan Sepinwall, reviewing for HitFix, said the episode was "fantastic, from beginning to end". Matt Richenthal of TV Fanatic awarded the episode a 4.8 out of 5 and described Breaking Bad as "the best show on television". Donna Bowman of The A.V. Club awarded the episode an "A". James Poniewozik of Time magazine described the finale as "stunning, morally searing and, well, explosive ... with a few holy-crap moments for the ages", while Tim Goodman of The Hollywood Reporter reckoned that the episode "did a lot of things right, course-correcting most ... worries and giving viewers not only an action-packed, satisfying episode but putting the show on the path to finish ... in a nearly perfect dramatic state."

Awards 

The episode was nominated for seven Primetime Emmy Awards at the 64th ceremony, including Outstanding Directing for a Drama Series for Vince Gilligan; Outstanding Guest Actor in a Drama Series for Mark Margolis; Outstanding Cinematography for a Single-Camera Series; Outstanding Single-Camera Picture Editing for a Drama Series; Outstanding Sound Editing for a Series; Outstanding Sound Mixing for a Comedy or Drama Series (One-Hour); and Outstanding Special Visual Effects in a Supporting Role. Editor Skip Macdonald won the ACE Eddie Award for Best Edited One-Hour Series for Commercial Television for this episode. Gilligan was nominated for the Directors Guild of America Award for Outstanding Directorial Achievement in Dramatic Series. The episode also received nominations for Outstanding Achievement in Sound Mixing for Television Series at the Cinema Audio Society Awards; Best Sound Editing in Television – Short Form: Sound Effects and Foley at the Golden Reel Awards; and Outstanding Supporting Visual Effects in a Broadcast Program at the Visual Effects Society Awards.

Notes

References

External links 
"Face Off" at the official Breaking Bad site

2011 American television episodes
Breaking Bad (season 4) episodes
Murder–suicide in television
Television episodes directed by Vince Gilligan
Television episodes written by Vince Gilligan